The history of Vancouver Whitecaps FC, a professional soccer team based in Vancouver, Canada, spans over four decades. The first team to use the "Whitecaps" name was the Vancouver Whitecaps of the now-defunct North American Soccer League, playing from 1974 to 1984. After two years while the core of the players were focused on preparations for the 1986 World Cup, a second version of the club was founded in 1986 as the Vancouver 86ers. This team bought back the Whitecaps name in 2000 and has operated continuously in various leagues since 1986. A Whitecaps FC team began play in Major League Soccer starting in 2011 making it the first time since 1984 that a "Whitecaps" team played in the top tier of soccer in the United States and Canada.

NASL (1974–84) 

The original Vancouver Whitecaps were founded on December 11, 1973 and during the 1970s and 1980s played in the North American Soccer League (NASL). The founding investors in the club were: Herb Capozzi, president; Denny Veitch, general manager; C. N. "Chunky" Woodward owner of Woodwards Department Stores; Chuck Wills, lawyer; Wendy McDonald, president of B.C. Bearing Engineers; Pat McCleary and Harry Moll, proprietors of Charlie Brown Steak House.

The Whitecaps achieved success, winning the 1979 Soccer Bowl coached by Tony Waiters. The Whitecaps of that era included international players such as Alan Ball, but also "home grown" stars like Bruce Wilson, Bobby and Sam Lenarduzzi, Buzz Parsons, and Glen Johnson. In 1979 the team from the "Village of Vancouver" (a reference to ABC TV sportscaster Jim McKay's observation that "Vancouver must be like the deserted village right now", with so many people watching the game on TV) beat the powerhouse New York Cosmos in one of the most thrilling playoff series in NASL history to advance to the Soccer Bowl. In the Soccer Bowl, they triumphed against the Tampa Bay Rowdies in a disappointed New York City.

It was during this short period that soccer interest peaked in Vancouver. The Whitecaps attendance at Empire Stadium grew to regular sellouts, at 32,000. The team also recorded two tracks, with "White is the Colour" becoming a hit on local radio during the run-up to their championship win.

After playing at Vancouver's 32,000-seat Empire Stadium for most of their existence, the team moved into the brand new 60,000-seat BC Place Stadium in 1983. The Whitecaps set a then highest all-time Canadian attendance record of 60,342 spectators for a professional soccer game, on June 20, 1983, Vancouver Whitecaps FC – Seattle Sounders at BC Place. However, the subsequent demise of the NASL in 1984 meant the Whitecaps – along with the other teams in the NASL – were forced to fold.

CSL (1985–92) 

Several of the players from the NASL Vancouver Whitecaps were members of the Canadian Men's National Team preparing for the 1986 World Cup in training camps held in Vancouver. They played exhibition games against teams in the Western Soccer Alliance Challenge Series in 1985. Several are listed on the 1986 FIFA World Cup squads lists as playing for the MISL's Tacoma Stars for the indoor season and played with the Canadian National Men's Team for the outdoor summer season.

The Vancouver 86ers Soccer Club started operations in November 1985 by the community-owned West Coast Soccer Society. Tony Waiters, Les Wilson and Dave Fryatt were the first franchise holders granted the rights for Vancouver on July 26, 1986. The Vancouver 86ers were so named because of the year of the team's founding-1986, the 86 principals underwriting the club, and to commemorate the year the city of Vancouver was founded (1886). There were a lot of ties between the Whitecaps and the 86ers such as Tony Waiters (shareholder), Buzz Parsons (manager 1987–88), Bob Lenarduzzi (coach 1987–1993), Carl Valentine, Jim Easton, David Norman, Dale Mitchell. In newspaper reports the Whitecaps were often referred to as the previous version of the CSL's Vancouver 86ers. Several attempts were made to purchase the Whitecaps name; however, the name was not for sale or the owner wanted too much money for the cash strapped community-owned club.

The Vancouver 86ers played its first game in 1987 in the Canadian Soccer League against Edmonton. The 86ers played in the Canadian Soccer League (CSL) winning four straight CSL Championships (1988–1991) and five consecutive CSL regular-season first-place finishes (1988–92). Vancouver played in the CSL from its inception in 1987 until the league folded in 1992, and then moved over to the APSL in 1993 which was later absorbed into the USL hierarchy of leagues in 1997 becoming the A-League, later renamed the USL-1.

In 1988–1989, the team, coached by Bob Lenarduzzi, set a North American professional sports record by playing 46 consecutive games without a loss. The record began after the June 1988 match the 86ers lost 3–1 away to the North York Rockets. Vancouver then won 37 matches and tied nine others before falling 2–1 away to the Edmonton Brickmen in August 1989. In 2004 the BC Sports Hall of Fame inducted the 1989 soccer team. Also in 1988 the Vancouver 86ers and Calgary Kickers played six friendly matches each against the Western Soccer Alliance in the month of May.

In 1990, the Vancouver 86ers captured the North American Club Championship after defeating the Maryland Bays 3–2 in the final played in Burnaby. The game was played between the champions of the Canadian Soccer League and the champions of the American Professional Soccer League (APSL).  The Vancouver 86ers withdrew from the 1992 CONCACAF Champions' Cup prior to the opening Group 2 first round match due to financial constraints.  The 86ers also came up short in the first round of the 1992 ‘Professional Cup’ North American Club
Championship where they faced APSL champions Colorado Foxes over two legs.

APSL / A-League / USL-1  (1993–2010) 

In 1999 Vancouver's player-coach who was one of North American soccer's last active participants in the NASL, Carl Valentine, retired.

With whole hearted support from the fans the new owner, David Stadnyk, bought the name Whitecaps from former NASL Whitecaps director John Laxton. October 26, 2000 the Vancouver 86ers formally changed their name back to the Whitecaps.

In the 2001 season, the team began to use the old Vancouver Whitecaps moniker. The club adopted a similar crest to that of the NASL team featuring a wave. A white cap is a nautical term for a wind wave, not a surf wave. For smaller boat craft, the appearance of white caps are a sign of rising wind and danger often necessitating a return to harbour. With the re-branding process of the MLS franchise, the club crest was expanded to include the white caps of snow-covered mountains and include all of the province of BC.

In 2003, the name was again changed, albeit only slightly, to Whitecaps FC, which encompasses the men's, women's, and youth development teams within the organization. At this time, the Whitecaps logo changed slightly in colour (the light teal-green was replaced with a brighter blue) and the word Vancouver was dropped from the image.

In 2006, the Whitecaps organization won an unprecedented double-championship, claiming both the USL-1 championship trophy, defeating the host Rochester Rhinos 3–0 at PAETEC Park, and winning the W-League women's championship. The men's team also won the Nation's Cup, a new tournament established by their club as a way to feature the Whitecaps playing against international competition. The 2006 Nation's Cup tournament featured the Chinese and Indian U-20 national teams and Championship Welsh club Cardiff City F.C. (the "Bluebirds"). They also gradually added the "Vancouver" back into their name, changing it officially to "Vancouver Whitecaps FC".

The following season, the Whitecaps signed a deal to play an exhibition match against the Los Angeles Galaxy, which featured international David Beckham, and promoted director of soccer operations Bob Lenarduzzi to team president. USL-1 teams, especially those in the US competing in the Lamar Hunt U.S. Open Cup, were beginning to see with marketing that MLS teams could be a larger draw as MLS's quality of play increased and the league gained a greater profile.

October 12, 2008, they claimed their second United Soccer Leagues First Division championship with a 2–1 victory over the Puerto Rico Islanders. Charles Gbeke scored twice with his head in the second half to help secure the title. In 2009, they placed seventh in the league and were eliminated in the final by the Montreal Impact on a 6–3 aggregate.

MLS (2011–) 

On March 18, 2009, MLS Commissioner Don Garber announced that Vancouver would be the seventeenth franchise of Major League Soccer. It joined the Portland Timbers, announced two days later as the eighteenth MLS franchise, for the 2011 MLS season. While no name was provided at the Vancouver announcement, over a year later the club confirmed that the MLS team would keep the Whitecaps name.

In preparation for its inaugural season, the Whitecaps brought in executive talent from around the world. On November 24, 2009, Paul Barber, former Tottenham Hotspur F.C. executive, was announced to join the club as CEO. Others joining him include former D.C. United head coach Tom Soehn as Director of Operations and Dutch national Richard Grootscholten as the technical director and head coach of the residency program. Former Iceland international Teitur Thordarson was confirmed as head coach on September 2, 2010 for the inaugural MLS season. He held the same position with the USL-1 and later USSF Division 2 Whitecaps.

Season results 

The following summarizes competitive results for all three incarnations of the Whitecaps. For solely MLS results, please see List of Vancouver Whitecaps FC seasons.

Key
Key to competitions

 Major League Soccer (MLS) – The top-flight of soccer in the United States, established in 1996.
 USSF Division 2 Professional League (D2 Pro) – The second division of soccer in the United States for a single season in 2010, now defunct.
 USL First Division (USL-1) – The second division of soccer in the United States from 2005 through 2009.
 A-League – The second division of soccer in the United States from 1995 through 2004, now defunct.
 American Professional Soccer League (APSL) – The second division of soccer in the United States from 1990 through 1996, now defunct.
 Canadian Soccer League (CSL) – The top-flight of soccer in Canada from 1990 through 1996, now defunct.
 North American Soccer League (NASL) – The top-flight of soccer in the United States from 1968 through 1984, now defunct.
 Canadian Championship (CC) – The premier knockout cup competition in Canadian soccer, first contested in 2008. The Voyageurs Cup (VC), founded in 2002, preceded the competition and now serves as the championship trophy for the current cup tournament.
 CONCACAF Champions League (CCL) – The premier competition in North American soccer since 1962. It went by the name of Champions' Cup until 2008.

Key to colours and symbols

Key to league record
 Season = The year and article of the season
 Div = Level on pyramid
 League = League name
 Pld = Played
 W = Games won
 L = Games lost
 D = Games drawn
 GF = Goals scored
 GA = Goals against
 Pts = Points
 PPG = Points per game
 Conf = Conference position
 Overall = League position

Key to cup record
 DNE = Did not enter
 DNQ = Did not qualify
 NH = Competition not held or canceled
 QR = Qualifying round
 PR = Preliminary round
 GS = Group stage
 R1 = First round
 R2 = Second round
 R3 = Third round
 R4 = Fourth round
 R5 = Fifth round
 QF = Quarterfinals
 SF = Semifinals
 RU = Runners-up
 W = Winners

Seasons

1. Avg. attendance include statistics from league matches only.
2. Top goalscorer(s) includes all goals scored in League, MLS Cup, Canadian Championship, CONCACAF Champions League, FIFA Club World Cup, and other competitive continental matches.
3. Points and PPG have been adjusted from non-traditional to traditional scoring systems for seasons prior to 2003 to more effectively compare historical team performance across seasons.

Honours

Domestic 

Canadian Championship for the Voyageurs Cup trophy.

 Winner: 2015,  2022
 Runner-up (9): 2005, 2007, 2009, 2010, 2011, 2012, 2013, 2016, 2018

League

NASL (I) 

Soccer Bowl/League Championship

 Winner (1): 1979

Regular Season

 Runner-up (2): 1978, 1983

Division Championship

 Winner (2): 1978, 1983

CSL (I) 

League Championship

 Winner (4): 1988, 1989, 1990, 1991
 Runner-up (1): 1992

Regular Season

 Winner (5): 1988, 1989, 1990, 1991, 1992

Division Championship

 Winner (3): 1988, 1989, 1990

APSL / A-League / USL-1 (II) 

League Championship

 Winner (2): 2006, 2008
 Runner-up (1): 2009

Regular Season

 Winner (1): 1993
 Runner-up (1): 2008

Division Championship

 Winner (1): 2001

Other 

Cascadia Cup

 Winner (6): 2004, 2005, 2008, 2013, 2014, 2016

Rivalries 

The Whitecaps have two sets of rivalries being a Canadian team playing in American leagues as well as having geography and historical leagues contribute to Pacific Northwest rivalries.

Cascadia 

Historically since the earliest days of soccer in the late 1890s BC-based teams have played at tournaments, festivals, and had exhibitions to determine the best team in the Pacific Northwest. Before the railways established links eastward, travel was south via steamship to San Francisco and then to the outside world.  Even afterward until at least 1910 BC commonly looked south instead of east.  Leagues such as the Pacific Coast Soccer League and most other popular sports played teams from Seattle, Portland, and even San Francisco occasionally.  Even afterward there were competitions oriented north–south that top teams such as the Westminster Royals competed in.  In the original NASL, the Vancouver Royals had links to the San Francisco Golden Gate Gales.

In 1974 when the Vancouver Whitecaps and Seattle Sounders joined the NASL, it is safe to assume fans were already used to travelling between the two cities to watch sporting events. There are fond reminisces about 3000–5000 Whitecaps fans drowning out Sounders fans at the Kingdome during the NASL era. There were links between staff and players between the Timbers, Sounders, and Whitecaps.  Former teammates such as Alan Hinton or Brian Gant played for the nearest rivals.  Even off the field there are similar stories; the Vancouver play-by-play radio broadcaster got the job at the last minute after the former Seattle Sounder broadcaster skipped out on Vancouver to take the job in Portland.

The Whitecaps won a title, while the Sounders were runners up twice, and Timbers runners up once.   The three teams ended each other's seasons five times in the eleven years the Whitecaps played in the league. The Whitecaps first two playoff appearances were both 1–0 losses to the Seattle Sounders in 1976 and 1977. In 1978 the Whitecaps would lose to the Portland Timbers in the playoff semi-finals.

The three clubs played exhibition matches after the NASL folded in the Western Soccer Alliance and in 1994 the Seattle Sounders and Whitecaps (as the 86ers) were both in the A-League (1995–2004).  The Portland Timbers joined the A League in 2001. They eliminated each other in the playoffs five times in the A League. From 2005 – 2009, the league was named USL-1 or USL First Division.  The Whitecaps and Sounders were the two most dominant teams in USL-1 with two championships each.  The three teams eliminated each other in the USL-1 playoffs four times. In all the years of division 2 soccer since 1996, the Whitecaps have been the dominant team with 1.55 points per game while the Sounders earned 1.54, and Timbers 1.47 points per game.  The Sounders have 4 championships to the Whitecaps 2.

The supporters groups of the teams created the Cascadia Cup in 2004. As of 2013, each team has won the cup three times each over the nine years of the cup's existence.

Canadian Teams 

The Toronto Blizzard (original NASL) were runners-up twice and Toronto Metros-Croatia won the Soccer Bowl.  Vancouver Whitecaps' first playoff win was against the Toronto Metros-Croatia August 9, 1978 in front of 30,811 at Empire Stadium (at the time the largest crowd to see two Canadian teams play against each other). The Toronto Metros-Croatia team felt the goalkeeper was interfered with on the second goal and planned to protest the result even having lost 4–0.  The Toronto Blizzard gained revenge by eliminating Vancouver in the 1983 NASL Quarterfinals when Vancouver had a dominant season finishing second overall in the league and most significantly Vancouver was host to Soccer Bowl '83.

Division 2 Toronto-based teams have generally not been as strong as Montreal and Vancouver.  Generally Vancouver Whitecaps teams have dominated Toronto-based teams, especially in the CSL and US-based D2 leagues.  When Montreal and Vancouver were in the USSF Division 2 and USL-1 playing Toronto FC in the Voyageurs Cup, the rivalry had greater meaning for Vancouver as it was the chance to prove themselves in a meaningful game  against competition that was higher level only by fiat.

The rivalry against Montreal is another matter.  In the original Canadian Soccer League (1987–92) with the 86ers head coach, Bob Lenarduzzi, taking on the Canadian Men's National Team management, many of the players for the Montreal Supra took umbrage at not being called up for the national team and there was a "real hatred" between the players. Most of those players joined the debuting Montreal Impact of the APSL when the CSL folded. Former players remember trips such as one in 1996 when fire alarms were pulled at 2 am and training facilities were not made available when promised, plus other antics. Montreal Impact also won the first seven Voyageurs Cup competitions.

Significant matches between the two clubs include several league playoffs and Voyageurs Cups.  During the late 2000s both clubs were strong and with two new additional matches against each other through the Canadian Championship familiarity brought discord.  Several players moved between the two teams for financial reasons such as Eduardo Sebrango and red cards became common occurrences.  In the 2006 USL-1 playoff semifinals the Whitecaps outplayed the Impact in the first leg at Vancouver's Swanguard Stadium, however both legs including the second hosted by Montreal finished 0–0. After extra-time, the Whitecaps defeated the Impact 2–0.  The Whitecaps and Impact also faced-off in the USL-1 playoff finals in 2008 and 2009.  While the Impact won the first leg hosted in Montreal 1–0, they lost the 2008 semifinal after the Whitecaps won the second leg at Swangard 2–0.  The most controversial game between the two clubs was in 2009.

2009 Montreal Controversy 

On June 18, 2009 the Impact fielded a weak squad in their Voyageurs Cup game against Toronto FC, since they were no longer in contention for the cup. They lost the game 6–1, allowing TFC to win the cup over Vancouver on goal difference. Coach Marc Dos Santos was resting key players for the league match against Vancouver two days later.  This result was used to convince the Canadian Soccer Association to change the Canadian Championship format. Two days later Montreal Impact won their USL-1 league game against Vancouver 2–1 . The Montreal Ultras protested against the Impact's management's unsportsmanlike behaviour by boycotting first half. In the final standings the extra 3 points Montreal got against Vancouver was the difference between 5th and 7th place, giving the Montreal Impact home advantage over the Whitecaps in the final, playing the second of the two leg playoff at home. Montreal Impact won the league playoff final's second leg 3–1 at home, and won the USL-1 Championship 6–3 on aggregate.  The Whitecaps have players sent off in both legs.

List of players

All-time rosters 

 All-time Vancouver Whitecaps roster (1986–2010)
 List of Vancouver Whitecaps FC players (2011–)

Captains 

 DeMerit was injured in the 2013 season-opening match and only played in eight games. Various players have filled-in as captain match-by-match.

All-time goal scorers 

Note: NASL, CSL, APSL, A-League, USL-1, USSF D-2, and MLS(Regular Season, Playoffs, North American Club Championship, and Canadian Championship)

All-time appearances 

Note: NASL, CSL, APSL, A-League, USL-1, USSF D-2, and MLS(Regular Season, Playoffs, North American Club Championship, and Canadian Championship)

Managers 

 NASL

 CSL / APSL / A-League / USL-1 / USSF-D2

 MLS team

Notes 

V